Edmonstone may refer to:

George Frederick Edmonstone (1813–1864), administrator in India
Edmonstone baronets